Murray Point is a hamlet in the Canadian province of Saskatchewan. The community is located on the western shore of Emma Lake and surrounded by Great Blue Heron Provincial Park.

See also 
List of communities in Saskatchewan
Emma Lake Artist's Workshops

References 

Unincorporated communities in Saskatchewan
Lakeland No. 521, Saskatchewan
Division No. 15, Saskatchewan